USCGC Grand Isle (WPB-1338) is an  operated by the United States Coast Guard.
She was based in Gloucester, Massachusetts, and named after Grand Isle, Louisiana.

In January 2012 Grand Isle returned to Gloucester after repairs that took six months.
When she entered the Baltimore dockyard in the summer of 2011, she was estimated to require $1.6 million in repairs, repairs that would take eight weeks.
However, more extensive repairs were required, which took longer, and cost $2.7 million.

As of December 2016, the United States Government transferred Grand Isle from the United States Coast Guard to the Pakistan Navy's Maritime Security Agency under the Office of International Acquisition’s Excess Defense Articles (EDA) Program, together with sister ship Key Biscayne. Grand Isle was renamed Sabqat and assigned number 1066.

A life ring from the cutter appears hanging on a wall of the bar the background of a scene in Episode 10 from the Netflix show Locke & Key.

Design
The s were constructed in Bollinger Shipyards, Lockport, Louisiana. It is powered by two Paxman Valenta 16 CM diesel engines or two Caterpillar 3516 diesel engines. It has two  3304T diesel generators made by Caterpillar; these can serve as motor–generators. Its hull is constructed from highly strong steel, and the superstructure and major deck are constructed from aluminum.

It is fitted with one  machine gun and two  M60 light machine guns; it may also be fitted with two Browning .50 caliber machine guns. It is fitted with satellite navigation systems, collision avoidance systems, surface radar, and a Loran C system. Its complement is sixteen (two officers and fourteen crew members). Island-class patrol boats are based on Vosper Thornycroft  patrol boats and have similar dimensions.

References

1991 ships
Island-class patrol boats
Ships transferred from the United States Navy to the Pakistan Navy
Ships built in Lockport, Louisiana